Cian Jude Hayes is a professional footballer who plays as a forward for Fleetwood Town. Born in England, he is a youth international for Ireland.

Career

Club career

Fleetwood Town
On 13 November 2019, Hayes made his debut for Fleetwood Town in a 5–2 EFL Trophy win against Oldham Athletic, becoming Fleetwood's youngest ever player in the process. He signed his first professional contract in January 2021 with a deal lasting until the end of the 2022–23 season. Cian Hayes scored a 45 yard screamer, the winning goal, against Shrewbury in a youth alliance league game to win the league for Fleetwood Town u18s, they celebrated the win of the league against Salford the week after were Hayes scored 4 goals when they won 4-1 and went on to lift the trophy in front of 2000 fans.

FC United of Manchester loan
On 22 October 2021, Fleetwood Town announced that Hayes had joined Northern Premier League side FC United of Manchester on a one month loan. His league debut in senior football came a day later as he scored to make it 2–0 in an eventual 3–2 win over Witton Albion at Wincham Park. Hayes scored on his final appearance for FC United on 27 November 2021 in a 2–0 win over Mickleover. He made a total of 4 appearances during his time with the club, scoring twice.

International career
On 4 October 2021, he was called up to the Republic of Ireland U19 squad for the first time, for their double header of friendlies against Sweden U19 in Marbella, Spain. He made his underage international debut on 11 October 2021 in a 1–1 draw with Sweden. He scored his first international goal on 29 March 2022, scoring in a 4–0 win over Armenia U19 in a 2022 UEFA European Under-19 Championship qualifying Elite round game, on what was his 5th cap for the side.

Career statistics

References

2003 births
Living people
Republic of Ireland association footballers
Republic of Ireland youth international footballers
English footballers
English people of Irish descent
Association football forwards
Footballers from Preston, Lancashire
Fleetwood Town F.C. players
F.C. United of Manchester players
English Football League players
Northern Premier League players